Anita Gulli (born 26 June 1998) is an Italian World Cup alpine ski racer

World Championship results

References

External links
 

1998 births
Living people
Italian female alpine skiers
Alpine skiers of Gruppo Sportivo Esercito
Sportspeople from Trento
Alpine skiers at the 2022 Winter Olympics
Olympic alpine skiers of Italy